Adam Bighill (born October 16, 1988) is a gridiron football linebacker for the Winnipeg Blue Bombers of the Canadian Football League (CFL). Bighill made his professional debut with the BC Lions in 2011. He played college football for the Central Washington Wildcats. He also spent time with the New Orleans Saints of the National Football League (NFL).

Professional career

BC Lions 
After going undrafted in the 2011 NFL Draft, Bighill signed as a free agent with the BC Lions of the Canadian Football League (CFL) on May 31, 2011. Bighill had an impressive rookie season, playing an increased role as the season progressed. He played in 12 games, including the final seven regular season games, and the West Final and Grey Cup games. He led the club, and was ranked fourth overall in the CFL, with 22 special team tackles.

Bighill began the 2012 CFL season by replacing Solomon Elimimian at middle linebacker for the Lions, after Elimimian was signed by the Minnesota Vikings. After assuming the starting linebacker role, Bighill went on to amass 104 tackles (2nd most in the CFL) and 4 interceptions. Elimimian returned to the Lions midway through the season, but Bighill retained all of the playing time. He was named both a CFL West All-Star and a CFL All-Star for the 2012 season.

Bighill and Elimimian both returned to the Lions linebacker core for the 2013 CFL season. Bighill suffered a sprained ankle and missed Week 3 and 4. He played in the 16 other regular season games, and the Lions' lone playoff game. Bighill put together a strong 2013 season, accumulating 92 tackles, 12 special teams tackles, 9 sacks, 1 interception and 3 fumble recoveries (one of which he returned for a touchdown; his first of his career). In 2014, Bighill played in all but one of the 18 regular season games as well as one playoff game. He totalled 77 tackles, 12 special teams tackles, 6 sacks, 1 interception, and 1 fumble recovery. Following the season, Bighill's linebacker teammate, Solomon Elimimian, was named the leagues MOP, and both of them signed 3-year contract extensions on the same day.

In Bighill's fifth season with the Lions he played in all but one game of the regular season, contributing a league leading 117 tackles. Following the season, Bighill was named the CFL's Top Defensive Player. Bighill continued his dominant play in the 2016 season finishing 3rd in the league in tackles and earning his fourth CFL All-Star award in the past five seasons. On December 9, 2016, the BC Lions granted Bighill a release as per the agreements in his contract which allows him to pursue an NFL contract up until January 27, 2017. If he is unable to sign an NFL contract by that date he will be back under contract with the BC Lions through the 2018 CFL season.  Through six CFL seasons Bighill amassed 489 defensive tackles, 69 special teams tackles, 33 sacks, 8 interceptions, 8 forced fumbles and 1 defensive touchdown.

Bighill had a workout with the New Orleans Saints on December 13, 2016.

New Orleans Saints 
Bighill signed a future/reserve contract with the New Orleans Saints on January 4, 2017.  Bighill drew strongly positive attention for his performance during the Saints training camp and preseason. He was waived on September 2, 2017, and was signed to the Saints' practice squad the next day. He was promoted to the active roster on September 11, 2017. He was released the following day, and re-signed to the practice squad on September 14, 2017. He was promoted back to the active roster on October 12, 2017. He was waived again on October 17, 2017, and re-signed to the practice squad. He was promoted back to the active roster on November 18, 2017. He was waived two days later and re-signed to the practice squad. He signed a reserve/future contract with the Saints on January 16, 2018  On May 14, 2018, Bighill asked for release from the New Orleans Saints and was waived. Bighill played in three NFL games, contributing with one special teams tackle.

Winnipeg Blue Bombers 
Bighill signed a one-year deal with the Winnipeg Blue Bombers on May 19, 2018. Bighill finished the 2018 season as the Blue Bomber's nominee for Most Outstanding Player, was named to the CFL All-Star team, and was ultimately named the CFL's Most Outstanding Defensive Player. The Blue Bombers signed Bighill to a 3 year $750,000 contract extension in January 2019, making him the highest paid defensive player in the CFL. Bighill helped lead the defence for the Bombers as they defeated Hamilton 33-12 in the 107th Grey Cup, the game saw Bighill recover a fumble which led to an Andrew Harris touchdown. After the win Bighill said that "I've packed too many garbage bags. I only play this game to win championships. We're bringing it home to Winnipeg, it doesn't get any better than that."

The Bombers were set to defend their title during the 2020 CFL season although it was cancelled because of the ongoing pandemic. Bighill was scheduled to make $265,000 in the following season, but he took a $145,000 pay cut to stay with the Bombers and help the team in a league that was troubled financially by the pandemic. Bighill would go on to lead an excellent Bombers' defence that would lead the league in yards and points allowed. He had an acrobatic interception against Cody Fajardo during the 2021 Banjo Bowl. Bighill would finish the season with 70 tackles, two sacks, and two interceptions. His incredible season would result in him being announced the CFL's Most Outstanding Defensive Player for 2021, as well as a CFL All-Star. Bighill and the Bombers defeated the Saskatchewan Roughriders for the third time that season in the CFL West Division Final, as they would go on to their second Grey Cup game in a row. In the 2021 Grey Cup the Bombers trailed Hamilton late in the fourth quarter by a score of 22-10 but would rally to go on and win 33-25 in overtime for their second Grey Cup in a row. This was Bighill's third Grey Cup title. Following the season, on January 20, 2022, Bighill and the Blue Bombers agreed to a one-year contract extension. Bighill was named a CFL West All-Star for the eighth time in his career following the 2022 season in which the Bombers advanced to the Grey Cup final for the third consecutive season. On November 29, 2022 the Bombers announced that Bighill had re-signed with the club on a new two-year contract.

Statistics

Personal life 
Bighill was born with a bilateral cleft lip and palate. He is on the board of Toronto-based charity Making Faces, a charity dedicated to helping people cope with facial differences. His son Beau was also born with a bilateral cleft lip. After Wendy Williams mocked Joaquin Phoenix on her show in 2020 because of his cleft lip, Bighill relentlessly called her out and requested an apology. Williams did end up making an apology to Bighill on Twitter, as well as making two donations to cleft related charities and wished his son Beau good luck on his upcoming surgery.

References

External links
Winnipeg Blue Bombers bio
BC Lions bio

1988 births
Living people
American players of Canadian football
BC Lions players
Canadian football linebackers
Central Washington Wildcats football players
People from Montesano, Washington
New Orleans Saints players
American football linebackers
Winnipeg Blue Bombers players
Players of American football from Washington (state)
Canadian Football League Most Outstanding Defensive Player Award winners